Eastern Suburbs (now known as the Sydney Roosters) competed in the 30th New South Wales Rugby League season in 1927.

Details
 Home Ground: Agricultural Ground
 Lineup:-  
Cyril Abotomey 
• J. Barratt 
• Tom Barry 
• George Boddington 
• Bill Ives
• Massey 
• F. Jefferies  
• G. Hall 
• George Harris 
• G. Keys
• G.H. Clamback 
• H. Kavanagh
• Hugh Byrne 
• Nelson Hardy 
• P. Burton 
• Dick Brown 
• R. Kerr 
• T. Fitzpatrick 
• Rick Bevan
• Norm Pope
• Arthur Robinson 
• Jack Coote 
• Vic Webber
• S. Sharp 
• A. Carter

References

External links
Rugby League Tables and Statistics

Sydney Roosters seasons
East